AlgoSec is a network security software company based in New Jersey in the United States. The organization provides software for network security policy management, also known as firewall policy management.

The company's products are designed to automate the management and enforcement of security policies across firewalls, routers, virtual private networks (VPNs), and related security devices. They are intended to manage the configuration of their security systems, identify vulnerabilities, test the systems against their security policies, and ensure compliance to regulations such as PCI-DSS and Sarbanes-Oxley.

History 
AlgoSec's core technology was developed in 2001 by Prof. Avishai Wool and his team of researchers at Bell Laboratories. Wool and Yuval Baron founded AlgoSec in November 2004. At that time, the company was headquartered in Reston, Virginia.

In 2010, AlgoSec moved its headquarters and North American sales office to Roswell, Georgia (Atlanta area). In 2012, AlgoSec moved its headquarters to Ridgefield Park, New Jersey. Today, in addition to its Boston office, AlgoSec has sales offices in London and Singapore, and a Research and Development Center in Petah Tikva, Israel and London.

Products 
AlgoSec delivers its products both as standalone modules and via an integrated suite, the AlgoSec Security Management Suite, which includes:
 AlgoSec Firewall Analyzer: automates the auditing and analysis of firewalls, routers, VPNs and other security devices
 AlgoSec FireFlow: automates security change management workflow
 AlgoSec CloudFlow: offers visibility and management of public cloud assets
 AlgoSec AppViz: visualizes and analyses network applications

References

External links 
 
 PeerSpot review 
 Help Net Security Article

Computer security companies
Computer security software companies
Software companies of Israel
Companies based in Bergen County, New Jersey